Desmopsis is a genus of flowering plants belonging to the family Annonaceae.

Its native range is Mexico to Colombia, Cuba.

Species:

Desmopsis bibracteata 
Desmopsis biseriata 
Desmopsis brachypoda 
Desmopsis dolichopetala 
Desmopsis dukei 
Desmopsis erythrocarpa 
Desmopsis guerrerensis 
Desmopsis heteropetala 
Desmopsis lanceolata 
Desmopsis maxonii 
Desmopsis mexicana 
Desmopsis microcarpa 
Desmopsis neglecta 
Desmopsis nigrescens 
Desmopsis oerstedii 
Desmopsis panamensis 
Desmopsis schippii 
Desmopsis subnuda 
Desmopsis talamancana 
Desmopsis trunciflora 
Desmopsis uxpanapensis 
Desmopsis verrucipes 
Desmopsis wendtii

References

Annonaceae
Annonaceae genera